The Caribbean-Canada Trade Agreement known as ("CARIBCAN") is a Canadian government programme, established in 1986 by the Parliament of Canada.  The agreement was created to promote trade, investment and provide industrial cooperation through the preferential access of duty-free goods from the countries of the Commonwealth-Caribbean to the Canadian market.

Features of the agreement also include: seminars for businesspersons of the Caribbean region to learn more about developing a market for their products in the Canadian market, a programme to expand exports capabilities by Caribbean businesses and also the assistance of the Canadian Department of Industry and Technology in the Caribbean region for regional trade commissioners with the aim of trade promotion efforts to the Canadian market.

According to the DFAIT: the "CARIBCAN's basic objectives, then, are to enhance the Commonwealth Caribbean's existing trade and export earnings; improve the trade and economic development prospects of the region; promote new investment opportunities; and encourage enhanced economic integration and cooperation within the region."

Countries in CARIBCAN
 Canada -- Anguilla, Antigua and Barbuda, the Bahamas, Bermuda, Barbados, Belize, the British Virgin Islands, the Cayman Islands, The Commonwealth of Dominica, Grenada, the Co-operative Republic of Guyana, Jamaica, Montserrat, Saint Kitts and Nevis, Saint Lucia, Saint Vincent and the Grenadines, the Republic of Trinidad and Tobago, and the Turks and Caicos Islands.

Exempted items
The CARIBCAN agreement does not cover duty-free access for the following items:

Textiles and apparel,
footwear,
luggage and handbags,
leather garments,
lubricating oils and
methanol.

Other items are eligible for duty-free status if they can be certified as being either grown, manufactured or produced within the Commonwealth-Caribbean or Canada.  The definition to be designated as Caribbean as its origin is; 'having a minimum input of 60 percent of the ex-factory price of the goods (including overhead and reasonable profits) originating within any of the Commonwealth Caribbean countries (or Canada). The goods must also be exported directly from the Caribbean to Canada with no other work carried out at foreign transshipment points.

Future
This agreement after running its course for around twenty years, has been slated to be replaced by a full composite Caribbean-Canada Free Trade Agreement, with reciprocal equal access for Canadian companies to the Caribbean market as well.

See also

The Caribbean Basin Trade and Partnership Act - Involving the United States, Commonwealth Caribbean, Aruba, Costa Rica, the Dominican Republic, El Salvador, Guatemala, Haiti, Honduras, the Netherlands Antilles, Nicaragua, and Panama.
Department of Foreign Affairs and International Trade (Canada)

More: GO-Invest - Guyana

Similar Caribbean agreements
United States: Caribbean Basin Economic Recovery Act or Caribbean Basin Initiative (CBI)
European Union: Lomé Convention (succeeded by the Cotonou Agreement)
Between CARICOM: Affiliated Caribbean states.

Canada–Caribbean relations
Foreign relations of Canada
1986 in Canada
Organisation of Eastern Caribbean States
Caribbean Community